Carlos Alberto "Caco" Ciocler (born 27 September 1971) is a Brazilian actor and director.

Biography
Ciocler was born in São Paulo, in an upper-middle-class family, he moved to the performing arts world when he was about to graduate in engineering from the University of São Paulo. In that way, he enrolled in a dramatic arts course. His parents were not at all pleased with his son's choice, although he had already shown inclination to be an actor.

He is graduated from the School of Dramatic Arts of the University of São Paulo.

Filmography

Film

Television

External links

1971 births
Living people
Male actors from São Paulo
Brazilian male film actors
Brazilian male telenovela actors
Jewish Brazilian male actors
20th-century Brazilian male actors
21st-century Brazilian male actors
University of São Paulo alumni